The 2006 HSBC World Match Play Championship was the 43rd HSBC World Match Play Championship played and the 3rd time played as an official European Tour event. It was played from 14 September to 17 September at the Wentworth Club. The champion received €1,443,830 (£1,000,000 or $2,042,513.20) making it the biggest first prize in golf. Each match was played over 36 holes. Paul Casey defeated Shaun Micheel 10&8 in the final to win the tournament for the first time.

Course

Bracket

Prize money breakdown

Actual prize fund

Breakdown for European Tour Order of Merit

Source for $US Dollar conversions

References

External links
Coverage on the European Tour's official site
Wentworth Club official site

Volvo World Match Play Championship
Golf tournaments in England
HSBC World Match Play Championship
HSBC World Match Play Championship
HSBC World Match Play Championship